Héctor Silva or Hector Silva is the name of:

 Héctor Silva (Uruguayan footballer) (1940–2015), Uruguayan football forward
 Héctor Silva (Argentine footballer) (born 1976), Argentine football striker
 Héctor Hernández Silva (born 1964), Mexican Institutional Revolutionary Party politician
 Héctor Silva (rugby union) (1945–2021), Argentinian rugby union player and coach